This is a list of lists of databases or databanks:

List of academic databases and search engines
List of biodiversity databases
List of biological databases
List of chemical databases
List of Drosophila databases
List of genealogy databases
List of neuroscience databases
List of online databases
List of online music databases

See also
Data
List of online database creator apps